Albert Cadwell (1 November 1900  –  13 July 1944) was an English footballer who played for West Ham United as a left-half.

Cadwell was born in Edmonton, London, and joined West Ham from Nunhead during the 1923-24 season, the east London club's first season in Division One.

He played his first game for West Ham against Chelsea on 20 October 1923. Succeeding Jack Tresadern as first choice left-half, he made 297 league and cup appearances for the club between 1923 and 1933. His last game was against Charlton Athletic on 8 April 1933.

Cadwell represented the Football League in a game against the Irish League in 1930, and also played for London and Surrey.

References

External links
Albert Cadwell at Spartacus Educational

1900 births
1944 deaths
Footballers from Edmonton, London
English footballers
West Ham United F.C. players
Nunhead F.C. players
English Football League players
English Football League representative players
Association football wing halves